Candle Records was an independent record label that operated from 1994 to 2007.  Candle Records was originally based in Melbourne, Australia and founded in September 1994 by Chris Crouch.

The label concentrated only on local bands with an "emphasis on strong lyrics and a wistful, often humorous Australian feel" and was run more like a co-op than a corporation. Bands on the label would help each other, promoting the label and CD releases, as well as doing shows together. The first release by the label was The Simpletons's EP, The Nod, in October 1994. This was followed later that year by The Lucksmiths' Boondoggle and Cuddlefish's Grap's Fruity Elixir.

Candle went on to have over 100 releases. They took over independent record shop, PolyEster Records, on Melbourne's Brunswick Street and opened a Sydney office ran by Danielle Atkinson. Crouch decided to close the label down on 31 March 2007, citing "time for a change". The last release by the label was Darren Hanlon's single, "Elbows", in February 2007.

Just before closing down the record label, Candle put on a big farewell show that toured the east coast of Australia. Starting in Brisbane, and then moving to Sydney and finally Melbourne, the all-star show consisted of sets by regular Candle family members The Lucksmiths, Darren Hanlon, Anthony Atkinson and the Running Mates, The Girls From The Clouds, Mid-State Orange and The Small Knives. The Sydney gig, and the first of the two Melbourne shows, notably ended with an all-star cast performing an encore of Michael Jackson's "We Are The World".

Artists
 The Guild League
 Darren Hanlon
 The Lucksmiths
 Jodi Phillis
 Ruck Rover
 Anthony Atkinson
 Rob Clarkson
 Cuddlefish
 The Dearhunters
 Richard Easton
 The Girls From The Clouds
 Golden Rough
 The Mabels
 Mid-State Orange
 Tim Oxley
 The Simpletons
 The Small Knives
 Stella One Eleven
 Weave
 Jason Penna - 2019

Note 
An unrelated record company with this name existed in Hobart in the 1970s and 1980s, with Nick Armstrong as the owner/manager. Ian Paulin was one of the artists to be associated.

See also 
 List of record labels

References

External links
 

Australian independent record labels
Record labels established in 1994
Alternative rock record labels